Lucas Kerketta (born 20 September 1936 in Kahupani) is an Indian clergyman and auxiliary bishop for the Roman Catholic Diocese of Sambalpur. He became ordained in 1969. He was appointed bishop in 1986. He retired in 2013.

References

External links

1936 births
Living people
21st-century Roman Catholic bishops in India
20th-century Roman Catholic bishops in India